Mohamed Ben Rehaiem, also known as Hamadi Agrebi (20 March 1951 – 21 August 2020), was a Tunisian football midfielder who played for Tunisia in the 1978 FIFA World Cup. He also played for CS Sfaxien. He also played for Al Ain and Al-Nassr.
On 1st October 2020, the Stade Olympique de Rades (now known as Stade Olympique Hammadi-Agrebi) in Radès bears his name.

References

External links
FIFA profile

1951 births
2020 deaths
Tunisian footballers
Tunisian expatriate footballers
Tunisia international footballers
Association football midfielders
1978 FIFA World Cup players
Competitors at the 1975 Mediterranean Games
Mediterranean Games bronze medalists for Tunisia
Mediterranean Games medalists in football
Tunisian Ligue Professionnelle 1 players
Saudi Professional League players
UAE Pro League players
CS Sfaxien players
Al Nassr FC players
Al Ain FC players
Expatriate footballers in Saudi Arabia
Expatriate footballers in the United Arab Emirates
Tunisian expatriate sportspeople in Saudi Arabia
Tunisian expatriate sportspeople in the United Arab Emirates